The I. Edward Templeton House  is a historic building located in the central part of Davenport, Iowa, United States. It has been listed on the National Register of Historic Places since 1983.

History
This house was probably built for I. Edward Templeton, who was a conductor for the Chicago, Milwaukee and St. Paul Railroad. The 1890 structure is an example of an early mail order plan that was popular in the late 19th century. The plans, or in some cases the whole house, could be ordered from a catalogue or an advertisement found in newspapers or magazines.

Architecture
The house is a simplified version of the Queen Anne style known as the Shingle Style. This structure is also an example of a "pinwheel" house. It is a two-story square box, with a pointed hipped roof, and gabled projections that are asymmetrically placed at the front and on the sides of the structure. The house also features an Eastlake porch, a variety of surface textures and stained glass transom lights.

References

Houses completed in 1890
Shingle Style architecture in Iowa
Houses in Davenport, Iowa
Houses on the National Register of Historic Places in Iowa
National Register of Historic Places in Davenport, Iowa
1890 establishments in Iowa